Arthur Hiram Buck (born August 28, 1935) is a Canadian former politician. He served in the Legislative Assembly of New Brunswick from 1970 to 1974 from the electoral district of Moncton, a member of the Progressive Conservative party.

References

1935 births
Living people
People from Moncton
Progressive Conservative Party of New Brunswick MLAs